Beach Soccer Worldwide (BSWW) is the organisation responsible for the founding and growth of association football's derivative sport of beach soccer. The founding partners of BSWW codified the rules of beach soccer in 1992, with BSWW as it is known today having been officially founded in late 2000 as a singular institution to develop the sport and organise international beach soccer competitions across the globe, primarily between national teams. The company is recognised as playing the biggest role in helping to establish the rules of beach soccer, to spread and evolve the sport around the world as cited by FIFA who took on governing body status of the sport from BSWW in 2005. Having established the sport's key regulations, FIFA acknowledged BSWW's framework, making their rules the official laws of beach soccer and now controls them and any modifications.

Today, under the recognition of FIFA, BSWW continues to be main organisation that organises beach soccer tournaments and development (with FIFA's assistance) around the world, mainly in Europe, including the Euro Beach Soccer League, BSWW exhibition tour events and others, having involved over 110 national teams in the sport, as well as newly founded club competitions. Its founders also established the Beach Soccer World Championships; BSWW created a partnership with FIFA, FIFA Beach Soccer S.L., in 2005 to manage the tournament as the newly named FIFA Beach Soccer World Cup, the only major international beach soccer tournament that BSWW does not have a hand in organising but which is all the management of FIFA.

Members of the organisation serve on FIFA's Beach Soccer Committee.

History

Founding
BSWW's routes are traced back to 1992 with the establishment of the official rules of the sport by Giancarlo Signorini, the founding partner of Beach Soccer Company (BSC). In 1992, Signorini staged a pilot event in Los Angeles in order to test out and perfect these rules which remain very similar today. In July 1993, with the aid of his own company, BSI, Signorini organised the first professional beach soccer event, held on Miami Beach, Florida. A keen interest was taken by Brazilian sports marketing agency, Koch Tavares, who replicated the event in 1994 in Rio de Janeiro, Brazil and Viking Graham Sports Group, a Philadelphia based investment group, acquired BSI's rights to stage professional beach soccer events, forming a partnership with Signorini to create Beach Soccer Company.

Koch Tavares and BSC went on to be the main two entities involved in promoting beach soccer for the rest of the 1990s, with the former responsible for organising the Beach Soccer World Championships beginning in 1995, and the latter establishing the Pro Beach Soccer Tour in 1996, a series of worldwide professional exhibition tournaments to promote the sport, and the European Pro Beach Soccer League in 1998, all contested between national teams as opposed to clubs. BSC relocated to Monaco in 1998 and again to Barcelona in 1999, renaming to become Pro Beach Soccer, S.L. (PBS) in 2000 to reflect the branding of their established events.

In October 2000, the entity of Koch Tavares responsible for beach soccer and PBS came together to register one single company in order to streamline development of the sport under one unifying company, as opposed to multiple parties involved trying to synchronise progress between one another, officially forming Beach Soccer Worldwide, opting to remain based in Barcelona. Starting with the 2001 season, BSWW took on roles of organising all major competitions of the preceding companies including the Pro Beach Soccer Tour and European Pro Beach Soccer League, whilst supervising the World Championships and the newly created America's League, all remaining focused on national teams. This was also done to make it easier to bring on board sponsors, coordinate media coverage and present the football alternative to FIFA under a clearly defined, all-encompassing, representative body for beach soccer.

FIFA partnership

BSWW's attention immediately turned to FIFA. Beach Soccer Company had already ensured all tournaments from 2000 onwards were played under FIFA's fair play rules and delegates from both parties met multiple times to discuss for BSWW's rules of the sport and competitions to gain recognition and backing of football's governing body. By 2002, FIFA had come to an agreement with BSWW to adopt the rules and regulations that had been established over the previous decade, with some minor changes to ensure FIFA's interest in key components of regular football were respected and acknowledging key major tournaments in the sport including the World Championships. During this time, BSWW also brought on board major sponsors such as MasterCard, McDonald's and Coca-Cola for certain time period.

The involvement with FIFA was furthered in 2004 when FIFA Beach Soccer S.L. was established in agreement and partnership with BSWW, to take over responsibility of the World Championships, being beach soccer's primary tournament, to become an official FIFA competition. The newly named FIFA Beach Soccer World Cup would start in 2005, with BSWW staff acting as advisers. It was also agreed that FIFA would become the sport's governing body, taking over from BSWW.

However at this time FIFA also recognised BSWW as the main entity behind past and more importantly continuing promotion and development of the sport elsewhere besides the new World Cup, and so BSWW retained the organisation responsibilities and control of other beach soccer championships like the EBSL, with FIFA only taking full control of the World Cup. So much so that after the first successful World Cup in 2005, when FIFA established World Cup qualifying tournaments to promote the sport across all confederations to start in 2006, all responsibility was handed to BSWW to organise and execute such events, with FIFA only supervising.

Continued development

Since then, BSWW has continued to develop the sport worldwide, now aided greatly with FIFA's beach soccer training courses and refereeing. The Euro Beach Soccer League (dropping the pro from the title in 2004 as it was no longer reflecting of the company name) has remained BSWW's main asset, gathering up to 27 nations to compete in recent editions compared to just 7 in the first event in 1998 in a summer-long event. The Pro Beach Soccer Tour has also been renamed to the BSWW Tour for the same reasons, continuing exhibition events to promote the sport as far wide and remote as Réunion and Cape Verde with around 10 tour events a year. BSWW has continued organising the World Cup qualifiers, as well as establishing new regular international competitions such as the Intercontinental Cup (similar to the FIFA Confederations Cup) since 2011 and generating more interest from big sponsors like Samsung and Huawei.

BSWW representatives, in partnership with FIFA, have liaised with the International Olympic Committee a number of times, with Olympic-affiliated events such as the Asian Beach Games integrating beach soccer from 2008 onward, the South American Beach Games from 2009 and the European Games starting from 2015. The ultimate aim is to have beach soccer a sport in the summer Olympics. But despite a campaign for inclusion in the Rio 2016 and Tokyo 2020 Olympics., the sport was ultimately not included and so lobbying in cooperation with FIFA continues, to ultimately fulfil the goal of making beach soccer an Olympic sport. In 2017, BSWW secured beach soccer as a sport at the inaugural Olympic-affiliated World Beach Games in 2019 and hope to use its inclusion as a springboard for future absorption into the Summer Olympics.

More recently, a greater involvement from certain confederations in organising World Cup qualifying championships has eased the full involvement of BSWW, allowing the federation to promote the club side of the game more, establishing the Mundialito de Clubs (Club World Cup) in 2011 and the Euro Winners Cup (similar to the UEFA Champions League) in 2013.

Development of the women's game has also become a target for BSWW, with the first official game between Switzerland and Germany in 2009, promoting further international exhibition tournaments and friendlies involving nations such as England, Italy and the Czech Republic, with the Euro Winners Cup having a 16-club women's version for the first time in 2016 and the first Women's Euro Beach Soccer Cup also taking place in 2016.

BSWW has organised and delivered over 200 international events in more than 50 countries worldwide, involving over 110 nations from all confederations, assembling an audience of over 250 million households in 180 countries. Vice-president Joan Cuscó continues to serve on FIFA's Beach Soccer committee as BSWW's representative. In 2017, BSWW and FIFA agreed to extend their partnership until at least 2024.

Identity

Flag

Stars awards 

It has been standard practice for BSWW to award prizes to the top scorer, MVP and best goalkeeper at the conclusion every event of their organisation. However, in 2014, BSWW took this concept of awards to a new level, establishing beach soccer's first annual end of season awards ceremony, taking place during November in Dubai. The ceremony, a gala event attended by many of the world's leading figures in the sport, celebrates the achievements of top performers worldwide over the course of the season and has been compared to FIFA's The Best awards and the Ballon D'or in association football, in both importance, grandeur and equivalence for the those involved in beach soccer.

Some of the many prizes awarded on the night include best player of the year, best coach of the year, best goal and best team.

BSWW structured tournaments 
BSWW organises and has an input in many different competitions; the following are regular events that are ongoing:

Advisory role:
 FIFA Beach Soccer World Cup
Considerable input, with involvement from confederations, under the supervision of FIFA:
 AFC Beach Soccer Championship
 Africa Beach Soccer Cup of Nations
 CONCACAF Beach Soccer Championship
 CONMEBOL Beach Soccer Championship
 OFC Beach Soccer Championship
 FIFA Beach Soccer World Cup qualifiers (UEFA)
 Euro Beach Soccer League
 Euro Beach Soccer Cup (formerly)
 Intercontinental Cup
 Mundialito
 Multiple BSWW Tour exhibition tournaments per year
 Persian Beach Soccer Cup
 Mundialito de Clubes 
 Euro Winners Cup 
 Americas Winners Cup
 Women's Euro Winners Cup 
 Women's Americas Winners Cup
Affiliation only:
 World Beach Games
 European Games
 Asian Beach Games
 Mediterranean Beach Games
 South American Beach Games
 African Beach Games

Current title holders

Rankings 

BSWW established a ranking system for European teams in the mid-2000s as the majority of tournaments are held in Europe and it is the most active continent for national teams. Hence the ranking was used for seeding in competitions like the EBSL. However, in 2014, BSWW created the first world ranking table based on a similar system to FIFA's world ranking for association football national teams.

Sponsors 

Official Global Partners:
 Genius Sports
 Iqoniq
 Puma
 RealFevr
Official Partners:
 Nostra
 United Nations Alliance of Civilizations (UNAOC)
 Universo Mujer
Technical Partners:
 Idoven

Foundation 
Beach Soccer Worldwide extends its commitment beyond purely sport development. In 2009, the Beach Soccer Foundation was created by BSWW to tackle three main issues surrounding the sport:

 Environmental protection through awareness and recycling
 The development of children and young people through sport
 Awareness and prevention of skin cancer

References

External links 
 
 Beach Soccer Worldwide on Facebook
 Beach Soccer Worldwide on Twitter
 FIFA Beach Soccer World Cup on FIFA

Worldwide
International sports organizations
Organisations based in Barcelona
Sports organizations established in 2001